William Willoughby may refer to:

William Willoughby, 11th Baron Willoughby de Eresby (1482–1526), father of Katherine Willoughby and the largest landowner in Lincolnshire, England
William Willoughby, 1st Baron Willoughby of Parham (c. 1515–1570), English baron and nephew of the above
William Willoughby (c.1566-1615), MP for Nottingham
William Willoughby, 3rd Baron Willoughby of Parham (1584–1617), English peer
William Willoughby, 6th Baron Willoughby of Parham (c. 1616–1673), English landowner and politician
William Willoughby, 5th Baron Willoughby de Eresby (c. 1370–1409), English baron
William Arnson Willoughby (1844–1908), Ontario physician and political figure
William F. Willoughby (1867–1960), author of public administration texts
Bill Willoughby (born 1957), American former basketball player
Bill Willoughby, American conservationist

See also
William Willoughby Cole, 1st Earl of Enniskillen (1736–1803)